Kadampazhipuram is a gram panchayat in Palakkad district, state of Kerala, India. It is a local government organisation that serves the villages of Kadampazhipuram-I and Kadampazhipuram-II. The place is on the Palakkad - Cherpulassery Road.

Demographics
 India census, Kadampazhipuram-I had a population of 14,448 with 6,852 males and 7,596 females, and Kadampazhipuram-II had a population of 13,638, with 6,526 males and 7,112 females.

Landmarks

MNKMGHSS high school Pulappatta

SREE VAAYILLAKKUNNILAPPAN TEMPLE
High school Katampazhipuram

Sreekrishnapuram Central School Katampazhipuram

References 

Gram panchayats in Palakkad district